The 1936 Santa Barbara State Gauchos football team represented Santa Barbara State during the 1936 college football season.

Santa Barbara State competed in the Southern California Intercollegiate Athletic Conference (SCIAC). The Gauchos were led by third-year head coach Theodore "Spud" Harder and played home games in Santa Barbara, California, some at Peabody Stadium and others at Pershing Field. They finished the season with a record of nine wins and one loss (9–1, 4–1 SCIAC), with the only blemish a one-point loss to San Diego State. Overall, the team outscored its opponents 223–43 for the season. The Gauchos had five shutouts, and held the other team to a touchdown or less in 8 of 10 games.

Four Santa Barbara players were selected as first-team players on the All-Southern Conference football team for 1936: guard Doug Oldershaw, tackle Claire Busby, end Al Young, and halfback Howard Yeager. Center D. Hart and halfback Bob Morelli received second-team honors. Yeager averaged 10.7 yards per carry in 1936.

Schedule

Notes

References

Santa Barbara State
UC Santa Barbara Gauchos football seasons
Santa Barbara State Gauchos football